Spa is a city and municipality of Wallonia located in the province of Liège, Belgium, whose name became an eponym for mineral baths with supposed curative  properties.

Spa is one of Belgium's most popular tourist destinations, being renowned for its natural mineral springs and production of "Spa" mineral water, which is exported worldwide. The motor-racing Circuit de Spa-Francorchamps, just south of the nearby village of Francorchamps, also hosts the annual Formula One Belgian Grand Prix and various endurance races such as the 24 Hours of Spa. The world's first beauty pageant, the Concours de Beauté, was held in Spa on 19 September 1888. The town also hosted the Tour de France on 5 July 2010, when stage 2 of the race ended there.

In 2021, Spa became part of the transnational UNESCO World Heritage Site under the name "Great Spa Towns of Europe", inscribed for its famous mineral springs and its architectural testimony to the rise of European bathing culture in the 18th and 19th centuries.

Geography and Geology 
Many of the famous mineral springs in Spa are located on a hillside south of the town. In total, there are more than 300 cold mineral springs in Spa and its surroundings, classified into two types: light mineral waters and natural sparkling waters (called 'pouhons' locally). In contrast, the pouhon waters come from rainfall that may be decades old, having percolated through calcareous rocks hundreds of meters underground.

History

Pre-20th century 
As the site of cold springs with alleged healing properties, Spa has been frequented as a "water-taking" place since classical antiquity. Pliny the Elder (died 79 CE) noted, "In Tongrie, country of Gaul, there is a famous source, whose water, while sparkling bubbles, a ferruginous taste that is, however, feel that when we finished drinking. This water purges the body, cures fevers and dispels calculous affections." (C lib. XXXI VIII) The term Spa has since become eponymous with any place having a natural water source that is believed to possess special health-giving properties, known as a spa.

The spa town grew in the Middle Ages, in the oldest iron and steel centre of Liège Province. Prior to the exploitation of mineral water, the steel industry developed communication lines, which made it possible to develop the spa town.

As early as 1547, Agustino, physician to the King of England, Henry VIII, stayed at Spa and helped give knowledge to the world of the value of the Spa water. In 1559, Gilbert Lymborh wrote of "acid fountains of the Ardennes forest and primarily those located in Spa". It was translated into Latin, Italian and Spanish. In July 1565, the gentry of the provinces met in Spa under the pretext of taking the waters. At the hotel "Aux Armes of England", those present agreed to oppose the edicts of Philip II as austere and intolerant; this led to the historic 1566 "Compromise of Nobles".

In 1654, the exiled pretender to the English throne, Prince Charles, stayed at Spa, which made the place even more famous. A postal system between Spa and the outside world was established in 1699.

Since the 18th century, casinos have been located in the town.

20th century
In 1918, the German Army established its principal headquarters in Spa, and from there the delegates set out for the French lines to meet Marshal Foch and to sue for peace in the consultations leading up to the Armistice which ended the First World War.

During World War I, Spa operated as an important German convalescent hospital town between 1914 and 1917. The general headquarters of Kaiser Wilhelm II was, in 1918, the last place where he resided before his abdication due to the German surrender. In July 1920, the town hosted the Spa Conference, a meeting of the Supreme Council. German delegates were invited to this to discuss war reparations.

World War II saw Spa reoccupied by the Germans, but the town escaped the Battle of the Bulge in 1945 that stopped, luckily for Spa, just at its gates.

The Marshall Plan helped Belgium to recover quickly. In the 1950s and 1960s, mass tourism gradually developed, diminishing Spa's reliance on the elite as customers. These were decades of social tourism as well, with an attendance of more and more numerous Flemish and Dutch customers, while the Walloons went en masse to the Belgian coast in Flanders. Relaxation tourism replaced the thermal aspect of Spa.

On 17 May 1983, to mark the 400th anniversary of the export of Spa waters, HM King Baudouin visited the new facilities of the Spa Monopole SA, the Henrijean Hydrology Institute and the Thermal Establishment. A special train from Brussels to Spa conveyed the morning delegates and foreign and Belgian journalists. Then, arriving by helicopter, Baudouin landed in the Park fermière company and visited the city, its tourist facilities and spa.

The 1980s and 1990s saw the beginning of an infrastructure renewal and Spa radiation. In 1994, a new French song festival started: the "Francofolies".

In 2007 the festival attracted 150,000 spectators. In 1997, the area of Spa-Bérinzenne opened the Regional Center for Initiation to the Environment, one of whose specialties is water, etc.

21st century

In 2005, a new center "thermoludism" opened on the Annette and Lubin hill with panoramic views of the city. It is directly linked by funicular to the heart of the city and a new luxury hotel.

In 2007, the Spa-Francorchamps circuit completely renewed its infrastructure to comply with the best international standards, allowing it to continue to host the annual Belgian Formula One Grand Prix 1, in addition to many other annual sporting events.

Transport
Spa has two railway stations: Spa and Spa-Géronstère, where local trains of SNCB/NMBS link the city with Theux, Verviers and Aachen. The railway line used to extend further south towards Trois-Ponts, Vielsalm and Luxembourg.
Local and regional bus services in Spa are provided by the Walloon transport company TEC.
Spa is located on the crosspoint of national roads N62, N629 and N686. The nearest motorway is the A27 (E42), where a junction for Spa is located in the commune of Jalhay.

Heraldry

The Coat of Arms for Spa is a stylized pouhon housed in a neoclassical monument to the covering surrounded by a protective wall opened its facade. The monument is topped by a blue banner bearing the "Spa-Pouhon" inscriptions. "Argent masonry money pouhon of sand topped with gold-SPA Pouhon inscriptions on a blue background." The city colours are yellow and blue. The stylized pouhon is inspired by the monument that housed the pouhon Peter the Great until 1820.

Under the Ancien Régime, the shield was commonly used in spa towns. It was customary for the spa guests to leave their arms at the hotel where he had stayed in recognition of the benefits of the waters. At Spa, many hotels have inscriptions like "In the Arms of England", "the Duke of Orleans," "To the King of Poland", etc.

Climate 
Spa has an oceanic climate that is made more continental by its higher elevation and inland position compared to other Belgian climates at lower level or closer to the sea. Spa has a relatively high precipitation year round, with tricky weather something that the Spa-Francorchamps race track is known for. The elevation also results in cooler summers and frequent winter frost along with snowfall. Spa is quite gloomy year round although averaging both a drier and sunnier climate than nearby locations Stavelot and Malmedy that are also surrounding the race track.

Notable residents

 Giacomo Meyerbeer, composer, completed his opera here Robert le diable in 1830.

References in popular culture
The 1975 film Barry Lyndon is partly set in Spa during the eighteenth century.

The 1975 film Belle is wholly set in contemporary Spa and its environs.

Agatha Christie's fictional detective Hercule Poirot was born in Spa.

International relations

Twin towns – sister cities
Spa is twinned with:

 La Garde, Var, France
 Cabourg, France
 Eguisheim, France
 Gabicce Mare, Italy
 Bad Homburg, Germany
 Bad Mondorf, Luxembourg
 Jūrmala, Latvia
 Hinterzarten, Germany
 Bad Tölz, Germany
 Terracina, Italy
 Chur, Switzerland

See also
 List of protected heritage sites in Spa, Belgium
 Les Francofolies de Spa

References

External links

 Legend Boucles de Spa

 
Municipalities of Liège Province
Spa towns in Belgium
Cities in Wallonia